The 2013 Open Castilla y León was a professional tennis tournament played on hard courts. It was the 28th edition of the tournament which was part of the 2013 ATP Challenger Tour. It took place in Segovia, Spain between 29 July and 4 August 2013.

ATP entrants

Seeds

 1 Rankings are as of July 22, 2013.

Other entrants
The following players received wildcards into the singles main draw:
  Iván Arenas-Gualda
  Roberto Ortega-Olmedo
  Ricardo Villacorta-Alonso
  Christian Florentin Voinea

The following players received entry as special exempt:
  Andrés Artuñedo Martínavarr

The following players received entry as protected ranking:
  Albano Olivetti

The following players received entry as an alternate:
  Alexander Ward
  Iván Navarro

The following players received entry from the qualifying draw:
  Erik Crepaldi
  Mikhail Elgin
  Alexandros Jakupovic
  David Rice

Champions

Singles

 Pablo Carreño Busta def.  Albano Olivetti 6–4, 7–6(7–2)

Doubles

 Ken Skupski /  Neal Skupski def.  Mikhail Elgin /  Uladzimir Ignatik 6–3, 6–7(4–7), [10–6]

External links
Official Website
ITF Search
ATP official site

 
Castilla
Castilla y Leon
Open Castilla y Leon
Open Castilla y Leon
Open Castilla y León